The  was an infantry division of the Imperial Japanese Army. It was formed on 16 January 1945 in Sunwu County as a triangular division. It was part a batch of eight simultaneously created divisions: the 121st, 122nd, 123rd, 124th, 125th, 126th, 127th and 128th Divisions. The nucleus of the formation was the 73rd Independent Mixed Brigade, which was formed in October 1944 from the headquarters of the 1st Division.

History
On 30 March 1945 the 123rd Division's formation was complete and it was assigned to the 4th Army. It was tasked with the garrison of Sunwu County, adjacent to the 135th Independent Mixed Brigade in Aihui District. The division fought and withstood the Soviet invasion of Manchuria with heavy casualties, but did not yield until the surrender of Japan on 15 August 1945. The majority of division personnel were taken prisoner to the Soviet Union in September 1945.

See also
 List of Japanese Infantry Divisions
 Independent Mixed Brigades (Imperial Japanese Army)

Notes and references
This article incorporates material from Japanese Wikipedia page 第123師団 (日本軍), accessed 28 June 2016
 Madej, W. Victor, Japanese Armed Forces Order of Battle, 1937–1945 [2 vols], Allentown, PA: 1981.

Japanese World War II divisions
Infantry divisions of Japan
Military units and formations established in 1945
Military units and formations disestablished in 1945
1945 establishments in Japan
1945 disestablishments in Japan